Teach Me! is a 1968 short film (20 minutes) written and directed by Mike Nichols and starring Sandy Dennis.

Summary
A beginning teacher discovers in her first year's experience in a large, inner city high school that the satisfaction and rewards of motivating disadvantaged students outweigh the environmental problems and handicaps.

See also
List of American films of 1968

References

External links
 

1968 films
American drama short films
Films directed by Mike Nichols
1960s English-language films
1960s American films